The du Quenoy family is a French noble house of medieval and chivalric lineage. Its origins are in Normandy. The family was first mentioned in a Papal Bull issued by Pope Alexander III, dated May 17, 1181, to acknowledge its endowment of the Priory of Saint-Lô du Bourgachard (later part of the Seminary of Saint-Vivien, in Rouen). Initially seigneurs and chevaliers, the family was raised to a barony by King Louis XIII in August 1636. The family produced generations of feudal lords, army officers, and numerous knights of royal orders. A cadet branch of the family, now extinct, was elevated to the rank of marquis in July 1714.

References 

French noble families